The third series of Gladiators began airing on Seven Network on 13 April 1996.

Twenty four episodes were filmed at the Brisbane Entertainment Centre in December 1995, including three three-part specials.

The series was once again presented by Kimberley Joseph and Mike Hammond with Tony Schibeci as commentator, Mike Whitney as referee, John Forsyth as assistant referee and the Kix cheerleaders performed in the background of the events. Forsyth also acted as a stand-in referee in Quarter Finals 1 and 2 after Mike Whitney caught a stomach bug virus, and Forsyth's position as assistant referee was taken over by Neil Waldron because of this.

The third series suffered a slight decline in viewing figures and due to an increase in costs, production on the fourth series was halted until the revival in 2008.

Gladiators

Male
 Commando - Geoff Barker
 Condor - Alistair Gibb
 Hammer - Mark McGaw
 Predator - Tony Forrow
 Taipan - Michael Melksham
 Tornado - Tony Latina
 Tower - Ron Reeve
 Vulcan - John Seru

Predator suffered an injury in Heat 4 and was sidelined for the rest of the series. 
Taipan missed a number of episodes due to a knee injury and was only able to play in non-contact games like Hang Tough, Joust and Swing Shot.

Female
 Blade - Bev Carter
 Cheeta - Nicky Davico
 Delta - Karen Alley
 Electra - Roz Forsyth
 Flame - Lynda Byrnes
 Fury - Julie Saunders-Melksham
 Glacier - Lourene Bevaart
 Storm - Charlene Machin

Blade suffered an injury on Hang Tough in heat 7 when she landed on part of the arena floor not fully covered by crash mats. Whilst the fall was televised, Blade's injury was not referred to onscreen and she was sidelined until the semi finals.

Cheeta chose to leave the show after heat 4. Due to this, reserve Gladiator, Electra was brought in though she only appeared in six episodes and never appeared in the starting credits or any publicity material. The official Australian Gladiators magazine makes no reference to her. She is married to John Forsythe, who was assistant referee, stand in referee for quarter-finals 1 and 2, and Director of training.

Events

Atlaspheres, Duel, Gauntlet, Hang Tough, Hit & Run, Powerball, Pursuit, Pyramid, Swingshot, Suspension Bridge, Wall and Whiplash all returned. The layout of the Pursuit course was slightly changed or this series. Two new events were introduced, Skytrack and Joust, the latter of which had been recently axed in the UK series with the apparatus being shipped to Australia. Tilt which had only appeared once early on in the preceding series did not return.

Shows

A three-part individual sports athletes challenge preluded the third domestic series. 
Fifteen shows were filmed in a progressive competition, followed by a further two specials at the conclusion of the domestic series.

Winning challengers are in bold.

1These were the lasts appearances by Cheeta and Predator.
2This was the first appearance of reserve Gladiator Electra.
3Catherine Arlove was injured after Hang Tough and was unable to compete in the Eliminator. Marisa Huettner had to run the eliminator by herself against the clock. She won the series as the strongest competitor holding the fastest Eliminator time recorded in any series. 
4All four finalists won the right to compete for Australia in the second Ashes series in Birmingham.

Episode summary

Individual Sports Challenge

Individual Sports Challenge Heat One 
Original airdate: 13 April 1996Challengers: Karla Gilbert (Iron Woman) v Emma George (Pole Vaulter), Chris Fydler (Swimmer) v Peter Winters (Decathlete)

Eliminator

Female: 5 second start for Emma
Male: 7 second start for Peter
Heat One Winners: Emma George & Peter Winters

Individual Sports Challenge Heat Two 
Original airdate: 20 April 1996Challengers: Shelley Oates (Kayaker) v Nici Andronicus (Triathlete), Guy Andrews (Iron Man) v Sean Carlan (Hammer Thrower)

Eliminator

Female: 1.5 second start for Shelley
Male: 2 second start for Guy
Heat One Winners: Shelley Oates & Guy Andrews

Individual Sports Challenge Grand Final 
Original airdate: 27 April 1996Challengers: Shelley Oates (Kayaker) v Emma George (Pole Vaulter), Guy Andrews (Iron Man) v Peter Winter (Decathlete)

Eliminator

Female: 9.5 second start for Emma
Male: 6.5 second start for Peter
Heat One Winners: Emma George & Peter Winters

Domestic Series

Heat 1 
Original airdate: 4 May 1996 
Challengers: Allison Ferry v Joanne Rogers, Shane Vuletich v Wayne Neuendorf

Eliminator
Female: 2 second head start for Joanne
Male: 8 second head start for Shane
Winners: Joanne Rogers & Shane Vuletich

Heat 2 
Original airdate: 11 May 1996 
Challengers: Liz Ruffin v Marisa Huettner, Paul Stubbs vs Sam Soliman

Eliminator
Female: No head start
Male: 5 second head start for Paul
Winners: Marisa Huettner & Paul Stubbs

1Cheeta caught Liz but was disqualified by Mike Whitney for starting before the whistle.

Heat 3 
Original airdate: 18 May 1996 
Challengers: Leanne Martin v Mary Kominos, Cameron Simon v Paul Reynolds

Eliminator
Female: 3.5 second head start for Mary
Male: 5 second head start for Cameron
Winners: Leanne Martin & Paul Reynolds

Heat 4 
Original airdate: 25 May 1996 
Challengers: Nicki Richards v Kylie Saunders, Jamie Rafanelli v Phil Burgess

Eliminator
Female: 10.5 second head start for Nicki
Male: 2.5 second head start for Jamie
Winners: Nicki Richards & Phil Burges

1 Predator suffered a season-ending injury in Powerball and Vulcan was substituted in for the remainder of the game.

Heat 5 
Original airdate: 1 June 1996 
Challengers: Astrid Edlinger v Catherine Arlove, Joshua McEwan v Kerry Packer

Eliminator
Female: 2 second head start for Astrid
Male: 2.5 second head start for Joshua
Winners: Catherine Arlove & Joshua McEwan

Heat 6 
Original airdate: 8 June 1996 
Challengers: Jacqui Drew v Christine Dale, Jeff Prewett v Gavin Wise

Eliminator
Female: 0.5 second head start for Christine
Male: 11 second head start for Jeff
Winners: Christine Dale & Jeff Prewett

Heat 7 
Original airdate: 15 June 1996 
Challengers: Leesa Sharpe v Debbie Santic, Daniel Di Paolo v James Lenehan

Eliminator
Female: 2.5 second head start for Debbie
Male: no head start 
Winners: Debbie Santic & James Lenehan

Heat 8 
Original airdate: 22 June 1996 
Challengers: Sandra Hansen v Siobhan Skinner, Keith Hansen v Peter Cranney

Eliminator
Female: 2 second head start for Keith
Male: 2.5 second head start for Siobhan
Winners: Sandra Hansen & Peter Cranney

Quarter-Final 1 
Original airdate: 29 June 1996 
Challengers: Leanne Martin v Debbie Santic, Joshua McEwan v Paul Reynolds

Eliminator
Female: 3 second head start for Leanne
Male: 0.5 second head start for Paul
Winners: Debbie Santic & Paul Reynolds

Quarter-Final 2 
Original airdate: 6 July 1996 
Challengers: Marisa Huettner v Christine Dale, Paul Stubbs v Peter Cranney

Eliminator
Female: 2.5 second head start for Christine
Male: 5 second head start for Paul
Winners: Marisa Huettner & Paul Stubbs

Quarter-Final 3 
Original airdate: 13 July 1996 
Challengers: Joanne Rogers & Catherine Arlove, Phil Burgess v Jeff Prewett

Eliminator
Female: 9 second head start for Catherine
Male: 10 second head start for Jeff
Winners: Catherine Arlove & Jeff Prewett

1 Fury caught Joanne early but lost her footing on the track, forcing Catherine to crash in to her.  Fury was taken down and Catherine re-ran her race with Delta which she won.

Quarter-Final 4 
Original airdate: 20 July 1996 
Challengers: Nicki Richards v Sandra Hansen, Shane Vuletich v James Lenehan

Eliminator
Female: 1 second head start for Sandra
Male: 4.5 second head start for Shane
Winners: Sandra Hansen & Shane Vuletich

Semi-Final 1 
Original airdate: 27 July 1996 
Challengers: Sandra Hansen v Catherine Arlove, Shane Vuletich v Paul Stubbs

Eliminator
Female: 7.5 second head start for Catherine
Male: 5 second head start for Paul
Winners: Catherine Arlove & Paul Stubbs

1 Despite appearing to hit Catherine's buzzer multiple times, no sparks appeared. Upon replay a malfunction was reported and Catherine received 0 points.
2 Catherine had legally hit Glacier off the bridge, however threw her hammerhead to the matts, and in a controversial ruling only scored five points. 
3 Shane's detonator triggered despite Tornado not being remotely close to him, luckily he kept running the race to claim his ten points. 
4 Hammer was disqualified for dropping his hammerhead.

Semi-Final 2 
Original airdate: 3 August 1996 
Challengers: Marisa Huettner v Debbie Santic, Jeff Prewett v Paul Reynolds 

Eliminator
Female: 2 second head start for Debbie
Male: 2 second head start for Paul
Winners: Marisa Huettner & Paul Reynolds

Grand Final 
Original airdate: 10 August 1996Challengers: Catherine Arlove v Marisa Huettner, Paul Reynolds v Paul Stubbs

Eliminator

Female: Catherine forced to pull out of eliminator due to shoulder injury. 
Male: 0.5 second start for Paul.R.
Series 3 Winners: Marisa Huettner & Paul Reynolds

1 Storm was disqualified for holding and impeding Marisa's progress during the web trap 
2 Despite crossing the line first for 10 points, Paul Reynolds' score was reduced to 6 for knocking over two cones

Team Sports Special 
This was a 3-episode team event between the Australian sports teams.

Team Sports Special Heat One 
Original airdate: 17 August 1996Challengers: 
Natalie Shapiro & Leigh Martyn (Softball) v Kristen Towers & Julie Towers (Hockey)
John Platten & Richard Champion (AFL) v Matthew Hayden & Jimmy Maher (Cricket)

Eliminator

Female: 3.5 second head start for Softball (Natalie) 
Male: 5 second start for Cricket (Jimmy)
Winners: Softball & AFL

Team Sports Special: Heat Two 
Original airdate: 24 August 1996Challengers: 
Debbie Watson & Naomi Castle (Water Polo) v Sharon Finnan & Keeley Deverey (Netball)
Graham Mackay & Jason Crocker (Rugby League) v Brett Smith & Michael Foley (Rugby Union)

Eliminator

Female: 3.5 second head start for Water Polo (Naomi) 
Male: 9 second start for Rugby League (Graham)
Winners: Water Polo & Rugby League

Team Sports Special: Final 
Original airdate: 31 August 1996Challengers: 
Natalie Shapiro & Leigh Martyn (Softball) v Debbie Watson & Naomi Castle (Water Polo)
Johnny Platten & Richard Champion (AFL) v Graham Mackay & Jason Croker (Rugby League)

Eliminator

Female: 5 second head start for Softball (Natalie) 
Male: No head start
Team Sports Special Winners: Softball & Rugby League

1 Storm was red-carded for attacking the challenger's head while pulling from the Wall. 
2 In an Australian Gladiators first, both Richard and Tower fell from the bridge at exactly the same time, calling for a re-match.

Army vs Navy 
This was a 3-episode team event between the Australian Army and Australian Navy.

Army vs Navy Heat One 
Original airdate: 7 September 1996Challengers:  
Sandra Hansen & Suzie Llewellyn (Navy) Vs Sandra-Lee Walker & Michelle Perrone (Army)
Peter Gatti & Keith Lewis (Navy) Vs Gavin Davis & Ritchie Gibson (Army)

Eliminator

Female No head start
Male: No head start
Winners: Army won both Eliminators

Army vs Navy Heat Two 
Original airdate: 14 September 1996Challengers:  
Tess Donellan & Donna Hunt (Navy) Vs Candice Cushway & Jacinta Peel (Army)
Tim O'Brien & Jon Iles (Navy) Vs Dwaine Stevenson & Rick Morse (Army)

Eliminator

Female 1 second head start for Army
Male: 0.5 second head start for Army
Winners: Army won women's Eliminator, Navy won men's Eliminator

Army vs Navy Final 
Original airdate: 21 September 1996Challengers:  
Sandra-Lee Walker & Michelle Perrone (Army A) Vs Candice Cushway & Jacinta Peel (Army B)
Gavin Davis & Ritchie Gibson (Army) Vs Tim O'Brien & John Iles (Navy)

Eliminator

Female No head start
Male: 2.5 second head start for Navy
Winners: Army B won women's Eliminator, Navy won men's Eliminator.

Cheerleaders 

Choreographers: Davidia Lind, Simon Lind

Cheerleaders: Cintra Bedford, Jane Crichton, Jessica Emblen, Sarah Harlow, Tamra Lind, Tamara Raup, Emma Sieber, Leigh-Anne Vizer, Francene Vedelago, Kyle Watson

Production 

Production began in October 1995 following the success of series two. Recording dates were pencilled in for 11–22 December at the Brisbane Entertainment Centre.

The Gladiators were given their specialist training schedules in October and took a break from promotional activities in November whilst the production crew started work on the new events.

Filming began in December and continued through into the new year. Seating in the Brisbane Entertainment Centre was increased to 8,000 and the arena itself had some subtle changes with darker lighting and an increased use of spotlights similar to the UK arena at the National Indoor Arena. The Arena floor was also changed to a black floor with lights, just like the UK.

A fourth series went into pre production. Pendulum, a UK event seen in the International series was to be introduced and there were events being developed that would be unique to the Australian series.

However, due to injuries, rising production costs and a slight decline in viewing figures, Channel 7 opted not to go ahead with a fourth series and after being on television for an almost constant eighteen months, Gladiators was over until its revival in 2008.

References 

1996 Australian television seasons
series three